Siv Elin Hansen (born 10 August 1974) is a Norwegian politician for the Socialist Left Party.

Hansen served as a deputy representative to the Parliament of Norway from Troms during the term 2013–2017. She has been a member of Nordreisa municipal council.

References

1974 births
Living people
People from Nordreisa
Deputy members of the Storting
Socialist Left Party (Norway) politicians
Troms politicians
Women members of the Storting